In Japan may refer to:
 In Japan (Mr. Big album), 2002
 In Japan! (Buck Owens album), 1967
 The Jackson 5 in Japan, also known as In Japan